Nathupur is a large village located in the district of Gurgaon in the state of Haryana, India. 

The village is mostly dominated by Lohmods (One Of The Clans Of Gurjars) Followed By Yadav community.

Nathupur Pin Code is 122002 and Post office name is unknown. Other villages in (122002) are Chakkarpur and Sikanderpur. DLF Cyber City is built on the land acquired from Nathupur Village.

The village has a population of about 5,450 living in around 1,356 households.

There is a Rapid Metro station in Nathupur.

Nearby villages are Khor -Lohaka (3.693 km), Dundahera (4.256 km),  (6.400 km), Mohmmad Pur  (6.471 km), Mohammad Pur Jharsa (6.471 km), Samaspur (7.331 km), Jharsa (7.534 km) Sikanderpur (1 km) Chakkarpur (1 km)it is a most influential place for foreigners

References 

Villages in Gurgaon district